Sıla may refer to:

 Sıla (given name), Turkish feminine name
 Sıla (TV series), Turkish drama series
 Sıla (singer), a Turkish singer
 Sıla (album), 2007 album by the Turkish singer Sıla